Tiburtina is a station on Line B of the Rome Metro. It was opened on 8 December 1990 and is sited beneath the Roma Tiburtina railway station, which is served by FL1 and FL2 mainline Trenitalia services.

Nearby 
Università degli studi di Roma "La Sapienza"
Campo Verano
San Lorenzo fuori le mura
Quartiere San Lorenzo

References

External links 

Rome Metro Line B stations
Railway stations opened in 1990
1990 establishments in Italy
Rome Q. XXI Pietralata
Railway stations in Italy opened in the 20th century